The Nicaraguan Red Cross (Cruz Roja Nicaragüense), is a member of the Red Cross Society and the national ambulance service in Nicaragua. Founded on January 10, 1934, it remains the country's emergency medical response organization. The Nicaraguan Red Cross has its headquarters in Managua.

External links
Nicaraguan Red Cross Official Website

 
Red Cross and Red Crescent national societies
1934 establishments in Nicaragua
Organizations established in 1934
Medical and health organizations based in Nicaragua